The 1983 James Hardie 1000 was a motor race for Group C Touring Cars contested at the Mount Panorama Circuit, Bathurst, New South Wales, Australia on 2 October 1983. It was the 24th "Bathurst 1000" and the third to carry the James Hardie 1000 name. The race, which took place as part of Round 4 of the 1983 Australian Endurance Championship, was contested over 163 laps of the 6.172 km circuit, a total distance of 1006.036 km.

The Holden Dealer Team took a controversial, but legal, victory with the team's second Holden VH Commodore SS driven by John Harvey, Peter Brock and Larry Perkins. Harvey and Phil Brock qualified the car but after the #05 car blew its engine on lap 8, Peter Brock and Perkins transferred themselves into Harvey's car. Phil Brock never drove the car on race day and was forced to spectate as his three teammates won the race in the car he qualified in, a decision that he claimed was made by Perkins as team manager despite Perkins being the slowest qualifier of the quartet and despite it also being legal for four drivers to drive one car (something Perkins refutes claiming the rules only allowed a maximum of three drivers per car). The car was also the car which Peter Brock and Larry Perkins had won the race in 1982 and updated to 1983 specs, meaning this Holden Commodore became the first race car to win the Bathurst 1000 twice. The Holden Dealer Team Commodore finished a lap ahead of Allan Moffat and Japanese driver Yoshimi Katayama in their Peter Stuyvesant sponsored Mazda RX-7. It would be the closest Mazda would get to winning the race. Third was the STP Roadways Racing Holden Commodore driven by 1982 pole sitter Allan Grice and 1969 winner Colin Bond.

Only three cars in the race were driven by drivers who had both previously won the race. The three cars were: the #05 Holden Dealer Team (entered Holden VH Commodore SS of defending race winners Brock and Perkins), the #17 Ford XE Falcon of Dick Johnson and Kevin Bartlett, and the #16 Nissan Bluebird Turbo of Fred Gibson and John French.

Class structure

Entries were divided into two classes based on engine capacity:

Over 3000 cc 
For cars of over 3000cc engine capacity, it featured BMW 635 CSi, Chevrolet Camaro, Ford Falcon, Holden Commodore, Mazda RX-7 and Nissan Bluebird.

Under 3000 cc 
For cars of under 3000cc engine capacity, it featured Alfa Romeo GTV6, Audi 5+5, Ford Capri, Isuzu Gemini and Nissan Pulsar.the race for the under 3 litre class was won by Australian Driver Allan "ACE" Cant and co driver and team owner NZ born Les Grose in the #64 wideline windows ford capri.

Hardies Heroes
The final order of the first ten grid positions was established in the "Hardies Heroes" session on the day before the race. This involved the fastest eight cars from qualifying plus two others at the discretion of the organisers contesting two, single timed laps, one car at a time. The fastest lap of each car set its grid position.

 This was Peter Brock's record 5th pole position at Bathurst having previously taken pole in 1974, 1977, 1978 and 1979. This saw him move one clear of Allan Moffat who had been on pole four times. It was also the last time he would set pole driving a Holden, though he did sit on pole in 1997, but it was his co-driver Mark Skaife who had set the time in the runoff 
 Dick Johnson crashed in Hardies Heroes destroying his Greens-Tuf Falcon. In a show of goodwill no other teams in the race objected to the replacement #17 car starting the race from 10th position.
 1983 saw the first appearance by BMW in Hardies Heroes with Jim Richards qualifying his JPS Team BMW 635 CSi in 4th place. BMW became the 6th manufacturer to appear in Hardies Heroes following Holden, Ford, Chevrolet, Mazda and Nissan. The BMW was also the first 6 cyl engined car to appear in the runoff.
 1983 Australian Touring Car Champion and winner of the recent Castrol 400 at Sandown Allan Moffat was expected to easily make the top ten with his 13B powered Mazda RX-7, but could only qualify the car 14th, two places behind teammate Gregg Hansford whose car was running the less powerful 12A engine. This led to accusations of sandbagging by other leading teams, especially the Holden Dealer Team which claimed that Moffat was deliberately holding the car back in qualifying rather than showing its real speed.
 The 4cyl Nissan Bluebird Turbo driven by George Fury was the first non-V8 powered car to start on the front row at Bathurst since Peter Brock started second in 1973 in a 6cyl Holden LJ Torana GTR XU-1.
 With seven VH Commodore's in the top 10 this was Holden's greatest representation ever in the runoff. On the other side of the coin, Johnson's Falcon was the only Ford in the top 10, the lowest ever number for that manufacturer.

Official results
Full results of the 1983 James Hardie 1000 were:

Notes
 The names of drivers who practiced in the car but did not take part in the race are shown within brackets.
 Harris/Cooke qualified 30th in the #9 Bendigo Falcon but their car was used to get Johnson/Bartlett back into the race after Johnson crashed the #17 Falcon in Saturday morning's Hardies Heroes. The Harris/Cooke team took part in the race after Johnson's sponsor Ross Palmer (owner of Palmer Tube Mills) acquired the Lawrence/Russell Commodore. The Commodore and Falcon were rebuilt and painted for the race in a marathon effort through Saturday night. After getting stewards and other teams approval the DJR Falcon was allowed to start from 10th while the Bendigo Commodore was allowed to start from position 30. Following the race the Falcon, leased from Harris by Palmer, was returned to the Bendigo Team while the Commodore was returned to Palmer who promptly sold it back to Barry Lawrence.
 Andrew Harris had to get permission from one of his sponsors, Melbourne's Jefferson Ford, to use their Ford dealership name on the re-painted Holden Commodore, which was dubbed the Fordore by the team (the Commodore also carried 5.8 signage, the litre capacity of the Ford 351 Cleveland engine used in the Falcons). In a TV interview during the race with Channel 7's Evan Green, Harris told that he had offered Dick Johnson's wife Jill his Falcon for DJR to get back into the race after seeing a visibly upset Jill Johnson in the pits following her husbands qualifying crash, reasoning that the Ford fans would rather see Johnson in the race than himself. Driving the Commodore Harris ended up finishing 10th and winning the Rookie of the Year award.

Statistics
 Provisional Pole Position - #05 Peter Brock - 2:15.3
 Pole Position - #05 Peter Brock - 2:16.270
 Fastest Lap - #25 Peter Brock - 2:18.5 (lap record)
 Race time of winning car - 6:28:31.6
 Average speed of winning car - 158 km/h

References

Australian Motor Racing Yearbook 1983/84
Australia's Greatest Motor Race, 1960-1989 (©1990)
James Hardie 1000, 1983/84
Modern Motor, December 1983

External links
 Race results, www.uniquecarsandparts.com.au

Motorsport in Bathurst, New South Wales
James Hardie 1000